Thomas Erwyd Pryse Edwards was an Anglican  priest in the last quarter of the 20th century. Born on 26 January 1933  and educated at St David’s College, Lampeter, he was ordained in  1958. After a curacy in Caernarfon he was Assistant Chaplain of St George’s Hospital, London. From 1966 to 1972 he was Chaplain of King’s College Hospital, London. He then held incumbencies at Penmon, Menai Bridge and Bangor before being appointed Dean of Bangor in 1988, serving for ten years.

References

1933 births
Alumni of the University of Wales, Lampeter
Deans of Bangor
Living people